Authentik is an album by Jessy Matador, the Democratic Republic of the Congo singer, currently residing in France. Released on 28 June 2013 on Wagram Music, it is the third album of Matador following  Afrikan New Style (2008) and Elektro Soukouss (2010).

Track listing

Chart performance

References

Jessy Matador albums
2013 albums